Paul C. Pieper (born October 20, 1972) is an American guitarist and composer, known primarily for his work as a jazz musician.

Biography 
Pieper won second place from over 200 competitors at the 1995 Thelonious Monk International Jazz Guitar Competition, a global event whose judges included Jim Hall, Pat Metheny, John Scofield, & Pat Martino.  As a jazz musician in the Washington D.C. area, Pieper has numerous appearances at D.C.'s famed Blues Alley & a 2000 stint with the Smithsonian Jazz Masterworks Orchestra to his name.  Pieper has performed as a touring musician in numerous countries, including Bangladesh, Ecuador, Iceland, Japan, Korea, Russia, & Turkey.  A composer & arranger, Pieper's compositions "Spider Monkey," "Pensées," "Kineticism," & "The Red and the Black" have all been included on recordings led by other musicians.  As a session player, Pieper has appeared on upwards of twenty CD's, such as Buck Hill's 2005 release, Relax.  Best known for his work as a jazz player, Pieper's versatility is evidenced by his recent work as band leader and electric bassist for Five Finger Discount, a band performing classic funk songs; he is also a founding member of Washington D.C. area indie rock band Glass and Apples.

Discography

As leader
 Stories of Before (Bright Orange, 2005)
Standards (Bright Orange, 2018)
Making Time (Bright Orange, 2018)

As sideman
 Buck Hill, Relax (Severn, 2005)

References

External links 
Official site
minor7th.com review of Pieper's 2005 release, Stories of Before
Five Finger Discount official site
Glass and Apples MySpace site

1972 births
Living people
American jazz guitarists
21st-century American guitarists